The women's discus throw event at the 1998 World Junior Championships in Athletics was held in Annecy, France, at Parc des Sports on 31 July and 1 August.

Medalists

Results

Final
1 August

Qualifications
31 Jul

Group A

Group B

Participation
According to an unofficial count, 18 athletes from 14 countries participated in the event.

References

Discus throw
Discus throw at the World Athletics U20 Championships